The Eastern Province women's cricket team is the women's representative cricket team for parts of the South African region of Eastern Cape. They compete in the Women's Provincial Programme and the CSA Women's Provincial T20 Competition.

History
Eastern Province Women first appeared in the Simon Trophy in the 1953–54 season, playing in the tournament until the 1963–64 season. They next appeared in the Women's Inter-Provincial Trophy in 1996–97, and have played in the tournament ever since. Their best finish came in the 2003–04 season, when they reached the final, but lost to Boland by 64 runs. They currently compete in the second tier of the competition.

They have also competed in the CSA Women's Provincial T20 Competition since its inception in 2012–13. They achieved their best finish in 2013–14, topping Group B to qualify for the knockout stages. However, they lost both the semi-final and the third-place play-off to finish fourth overall.

Players

Current squad
Based on appearances in the 2021–22 season. Players in bold have international caps.

Notable players
Players who have played for Eastern Province and played internationally are listed below, in order of first international appearance (given in brackets):

  Audrey Jackson (1960)
  Juanita van Zyl (1972)
  Evne Webber (1999)
  Claire Terblanche (2003)
  Shafeeqa Pillay (2004)
  Dane van Niekerk (2009)
  Marizanne Kapp (2009)
  Jana Nell (2010)
  Bernadine Bezuidenhout (2014)

Honours
 CSA Women's Provincial Programme:
 Winners (0): 
 Best finish: Runners-up (2003–04)
 CSA Women's Provincial T20 Competition:
 Winners (0):
 Best finish: 4th (2013–14)

See also
 Eastern Province (cricket team)

Notes

References

Women's cricket teams in South Africa
Cricket in the Eastern Cape